KIHP-LP (96.5 FM) was a radio station broadcasting a religious radio format. Licensed to Shasta Lake, California, United States, the station was owned by Gateway Unified School District.

The school district surrendered the station's license to the Federal Communications Commission (FCC) on January 29, 2018. The FCC cancelled the license and deleted the KIHP-LP call sign on January 31, 2018.

References

External links
 

IHP-LP
IHP-LP
Radio stations established in 2005
2005 establishments in California
Defunct religious radio stations in the United States
Radio stations disestablished in 2018
2018 disestablishments in California
Defunct radio stations in the United States
IHP-LP